Ugo Bonnet (born 17 September 1993) is a French professional footballer who plays as a forward for Ligue 2 club Valenciennes.

Career
A youth player of Castelnau Le Crès until 2008, Bonnet moved to the United States for a year before joining Rodez when he returned to France. He made his professional debut in Ligue 2 with Rodez in a 2–0 win over Auxerre on 26 July 2019, scoring in the first minute of the game. 

On 27 January 2022, Bonnet signed for Ligue 2 side Valenciennes.

References

External links
 
 

1993 births
Living people
Footballers from Montpellier
Association football forwards
French footballers
Castelnau Le Crès FC players
Rodez AF players
Valenciennes FC players
Championnat National 2 players
Championnat National players
Ligue 2 players